ConceptDraw PROJECT is a project management software package developed by Computer Systems Odessa for Microsoft Windows and macOS platforms. It presents projects as Gantt charts with linked tasks, milestones and deadlines. Since 2008 it has been a part of the ConceptDraw Office software package, and can thus represent Gantt charts as mind maps and vice versa. It can also produce visual reports, work breakdown structures and other project diagrams via ConceptDraw DIAGRAM. ConceptDraw PROJECT supports import and export of text outlines, MS Project, MS Excel, and MindManager files.

Supported file formats
 CDPZ - ConceptDraw PROJECT document
 CDPX - ConceptDraw PROJECT XML
 CDPTZ - ConceptDraw PROJECT template
 CDMZ - ConceptDraw MINDMAP document
 MMAP - MindJet MindManager document
 MPP - Microsoft Project document
 XML – Microsoft Project XML document
 XLSX - Microsoft Office Excel Worksheet

Cross-Platform Compatibility 
ConceptDraw PROJECT is cross-platform compatible when running on macOS and Windows operating systems: files created on a computer power by macOS can be opened and edited on a Windows computer, and vice versa. The Developer's end-user license agreement allows for cross-platform installation with a single license.
ConceptDraw PROJECT is compatible with  Microsoft Office. It supports the import/export of MS Project files and MS Excel files.

See also 
MS Project
OmniPlan
OpenProj

References

External links
ConceptDraw PROJECT Official site
 ConceptDraw PROJECT Video Lessons

Office suites for Windows
Office suites for macOS
Project management software